The ABU TV Song Festival 2018 was the seventh annual edition of the ABU TV Song Festivals.

History
The event, which is non-competitive, took place in Ashgabat, Turkmenistan and coinciding with the 55th General Assembly of the Asia-Pacific Broadcasting Union (ABU).

List of participants

A total of sixteen countries took part in the ABU TV Song Festival 2018. Benin, Russia and Uzbekistan made their debut in the event, with Kyrgyzstan and Turkey returning. China, Malaysia and Zambia all withdrew from the festival. Benin represented the entry from the African Union of Broadcasting.

See also 
 ABU TV Song Festival
 ABU Radio Song Festival 2018
 Asia-Pacific Broadcasting Union
 Eurovision Song Contest 2018
 Eurovision Young Musicians 2018
 Junior Eurovision Song Contest 2018

References

External links
 

ABU Song Festivals
2018 song contests
Festivals in Turkmenistan